William Morton "Bill" Schuelein (August 6, 1927 – June 4, 2014) was an American politician and businessman.

Born in Akron, Ohio, Schuelein lived in Miami, Oklahoma. He served in the United States Army during the Korean War. Schuelein owned a Mobil gas station in Miami, Oklahoma. He served as sheriff of Ottawa County, Oklahoma from 1962 to 1972 and then in the Oklahoma State Senate, as a Democrat, from 1972 to 1992. He died in Miami, Oklahoma.

Notes

1927 births
2014 deaths
Politicians from Akron, Ohio
People from Miami, Oklahoma
Businesspeople from Oklahoma
Oklahoma sheriffs
Democratic Party Oklahoma state senators
20th-century American businesspeople